The Willamina School District (WSD) is a school district in Yamhill County, Oregon which provides K-12 education for the communities of Willamina and Grand Ronde. The district contains an elementary, middle, and high school which all reside on the same campus.

Headquarters 
The Willamina School District offices are located on-campus, along with the schools within the district. The district office was previously located on Adams street in Willamina, but moved to the K-12 campus in 2014.

Demographics 
Oregon Department of Education School District report card statistics indicate that within the district
 23% of students and 2% of teachers identify as American Indian/Alaska Native
 less than 1% of students and 2% of teachers identify as Asian
 1% of students and no teachers identify as Black/African American
 9% of students and 2% of teachers identify as Hispanic/Latino
 8% of students and no teachers identify as multiracial
 1% of students and no teachers identify as Native Hawaiian/Pacific Islander, and
 58% of students and 95% of teachers identify as white.

Additionally, the report card finds that 21% of students in the district have disabilities and over 95% of students qualify for free or reduced price lunch.

The school district spends an average of $11,300 per pupil.

History 
Willamina School District officially became recognized in 1907. Since then, the district has undergone major changes, including the consolidation of three separate campuses onto a single Kindergarten through twelfth grade campus.

References 

School districts in Oregon
Education in Yamhill County, Oregon
Education in Polk County, Oregon
1907 establishments in Oregon